The Kam Tin River, located in the northwest New Territories, is a river to the east to Yuen Long, near Kam Tin, Hong Kong. The river basin spans around 44.3 km2. The length of the river is about 13 km. Originating at an altitude of 910 metres near Tai Mo Shan, it has the second highest origin of a Hong Kong river.

See also
List of rivers and nullahs in Hong Kong

References

Kam Tin
Rivers of Hong Kong